The 2019–2020 Bikarkeppni kvenna, named Geysisbikarinn for sponsorship reasons, was the 46th edition of the Icelandic Women's Basketball Cup, won by Skallagrímur against KR. The competition is managed by the Icelandic Basketball Federation and the final four was held in the Laugardalshöll in Reykjavík during the days of 13–15 February 2020. Keira Robinson was named the Cup Finals MVP after turning in 32 points and 11 rebounds. She led all scorers in the competition with 97 points in 3 games.

Participating teams
Twelve teams signed up for the Cup tournament.

Cup Finals MVP

References

External links
2019–2020 Tournament results

Women's Cup